Arthrobacter ruber is a Gram-positive bacterium from the genus Arthrobacter has been isolated from ice from the Midui glacier from Tibet.

References 

Micrococcaceae
Bacteria described in 2018